Tilka Paljk (born 18 February 1997) is a Zambian swimmer. She competed in the women's 100 metre breaststroke event at the 2017 World Aquatics Championships. She also competed in three events at the 2018 Commonwealth Games. Paljk was born in Postojna, Slovenia. Paljk was named the Zambia Sportswoman of the Year in 2018 and 2019, and was named in Forbes Africa 30 under 30 in 2021.

Major results

Individual

Long course

Short course

Relay

Long course

Short course

Personal bests

This list include only above 700 Swimming points time.

References

External links

 

1997 births
Living people
People from Postojna
Slovenian female freestyle swimmers
Zambian female freestyle swimmers
Commonwealth Games competitors for Zambia
Swimmers at the 2014 Commonwealth Games
Swimmers at the 2018 Commonwealth Games
Swimmers at the 2019 African Games
African Games bronze medalists for Zambia
African Games medalists in swimming
Zambian female breaststroke swimmers
Swimmers at the 2020 Summer Olympics
Olympic swimmers of Zambia
Slovenian people of Zambian descent
Zambian people of Slovenian descent
Swimmers at the 2022 Commonwealth Games